Saint-Maurice-sur-Aveyron (literally Saint-Maurice on Aveyron) is a commune in the Loiret department, central France.

Geography
The village is located in the central western part of the commune, above the right bank of the Aveyron.

The commune contains the site of the former Fontainejean Abbey.

See also
 Communes of the Loiret department

References

Saintmauricesuraveyron